"Are You Teasing Me" is a song written by the Louvin Brothers (Charlie and Ira), sung by Carl Smith, and released on the Columbia label (catalog no. 20922). In May 1952, it peaked at No. 1 on Billboards country and western jockey chart (No. 2 best seller and juke box). It spent 19 weeks on the charts and was also ranked No. 11 on Billboards 1952 year-end country and western juke box chart and No. 14 on the year-end best seller chart.

The song was also performed by the Louvin Brothers on their 1958 album Ira and Charlie.

See also
 Billboard Top Country & Western Records of 1952

References

1952 songs
Songs written by Charlie Louvin
Songs written by Ira Louvin
Carl Smith (musician) songs